Acinetobacter indicus is a gram-negative, oxidase-negative, catalase-positive, strictly aerobic nonmotile bacterium from the genus Acinetobacter isolated from a hexachlorocyclohexane dump site in Ummari near Lucknow in India.

References

External links
Type strain of Acinetobacter indicus at BacDive -  the Bacterial Diversity Metadatabase

Moraxellaceae
Bacteria described in 2012